Wind power in Missouri has an installed capacity of 959 MW from 499 turbines, as of 2016. This provided 1.29% of the state's electricity production.

Missouri's total wind generation potential is estimated to be 340 GW.

Installed capacity
As of 2016, Missouri had 959 MW of installed capacity, all installed in the north-west corner of the state. At least six wind farms were developed by Wind Capital Group between 2006 and 2009. As of 2017, the largest wind farm in the state came online, the 300 MW Rock Creek Wind Farm in Atchison County.

Northwest Missouri is considered the windiest portion of the state and clips the windiest portion of the country which is known as Tornado Alley.

Source:

Transmission capacity
There have been several attempts at getting regulatory approval of transmission lines to carry wind power, either to the load centers of Missouri, or through Missouri, from major wind power producers in the Great Plains states to load centers further east.

Completed
The Midwest Transmission Project is a  180-mile 345-kV transmission line which became active in 2017.  It connects the Omaha Public Power District (at its Nebraska City, Nebraska substation with the Kansas City Power & Light substation at Sibley, Missouri and has one major substation in Maryville, Missouri.  The line was not specifically designed to supplement the wind grid but FAQ notes it "will create opportunities for existing and new future wind energy to access to the regional transmission system."  It is a priority project of the Southwest Power Pool.
 The Mark Twain Transmission Project was proposed by Ameren to connect Palmyra, Kirksville and Iowa. Approval was given for construction by each of the counties the transmission lines passed through, and the line was energized in January 2020.

Proposed
 The Grain Belt Express is a proposed 4 GW transmission line from western Kansas to Indiana. The Missouri Public Service Commission twice rejected the proposal, initially due to questions of the benefits of the project to the state, and later due to a lack of assent from all counties. The Missouri Eastern District Court of Appeals ruled the commission erred in its second rejection, but sent the case to the Missouri Supreme Court.

Planned growth
In October 2017, the Empire District Electric Company proposed installing 500 MW of wind turbines in Jasper, Barton, Dade, and Lawrence counties.

In May 2018, Ameren has announced plans to construct a 175 turbine, 400 MW wind farm in Adair and Schuyler counties. Construction is expected to being in 2019, with the project coming online in 2020.

In February 2019, E.ON announced plans for a 150 MW wind farm northwest of Columbia, Missouri in rural Boone County.

See also

Solar power in Missouri
Wind power in the United States
Renewable energy in the United States
List of wind farms in the United States
List of HVDC projects

References

External links